Caolu is a station on Line 9 of the Shanghai Metro. Located at the intersection of Jinhai Road and Jinzuan Road, it is the eastern terminus of the line. It began passenger trial operations with the rest of phase 3 of Line 9, an easterly extension with 9 new stations, on December 30, 2017.

References 

Railway stations in Shanghai
Shanghai Metro stations in Pudong
Railway stations in China opened in 2017
Line 9, Shanghai Metro